John d'Henin Hamilton, 3rd Baron Hamilton of Dalzell  (1 May 1911 – 31 January 1990) was a British peer and courtier. He served with the Coldstream Guards during the Second World War, and after succeeding his uncle in the peerage in 1952, became a Lord-in-Waiting and Lord Lieutenant of Surrey.

Hamilton was the only son of Major Leslie d'Henin Hamilton and his wife Amy Ricardo. Major Hamilton was a younger son of John Hamilton, 1st Baron Hamilton of Dalzell. Educated at Eton College and the Royal Military College, Sandhurst, Hamilton was commissioned into the Coldstream Guards as a second lieutenant on 29 January 1931. He was promoted to lieutenant on 29 January 1934.

In 1935 he married Rosemary Coke and acquired Beckington Castle, Somerset. Their children included James Leslie Hamilton (1938–2006), later the fourth Baron, and  Archie, born at Beckington in 1941,. later a Conservative politician and life peer. On 12 September 1937, he became a lieutenant in the Coldstream Guards reserve of officers.

During the Second World War, Hamilton  saw active service with his regiment's 5th Battalion, which formed part of the Guards Armoured Division, in the Battle of Normandy, and was injured there on 18 July 1944. Hamilton was awarded the Military Cross on 30 June 1945 for his service on the European front. He was promoted to a substantive captaincy in the reserve of the Coldstream Guards on 1 January 1949. After the end of the war, he sold his house at Beckington to H. F. Bailey, who re-established Ravenscroft School there, and moved to Snowdenham House, Bramley, near Guildford. Hamilton succeeded his uncle Gavin Hamilton, 2nd Baron Hamilton of Dalzell in his peerage in 1952. He was appointed a deputy lieutenant of Surrey on 16 October 1957.

In the 1960s, Hamilton was President of the National Association of Probation Officers. In 1961, he was with Queen Elizabeth II at Kingston on Thames as Vice Lord Lieutenant for Surrey. Lord Hamilton was appointed a Lord-in-Waiting on 17 September 1968. In 1973, he was appointed Lord Lieutenant of Surrey. Hamilton retired as a Lord-in-Waiting on 1 July 1981 and was made a KCVO the following day. He retired from the Lord-Lieutenancy in 1986, and was made a GCVO in the 1987 New Year Honours.

Lady Hamilton's sister Celia was the grandmother of Jack Brooksbank, who married the Queen's granddaughter Princess Eugenie in 2018.

References

External links
British Army Officers 1939−1945

1911 births
1990 deaths
3
Deputy Lieutenants of Surrey
Graduates of the Royal Military College, Sandhurst
Lord-Lieutenants of Surrey
Recipients of the Military Cross
People educated at Eton College
Coldstream Guards officers
British Army personnel of World War II
Knights Grand Cross of the Royal Victorian Order
Baronesses- and Lords-in-Waiting